Celestial Body is a 2000 Croatian film directed by Lukas Nola. The film received four Golden Arena awards at the Pula Film Festival.

Plot 
The film takes place during the Croatian War of Independence. When Serbian and Croatian armies exchange captives in the middle of a minefield, a nameless man without identity and memory, subsequently named Jakov, leaves the column unnoticed and wanders around in order to minimize other people's sufferings. On his dangerous journey, he meets a female first-fighter who runs an orphanage, a commander who returned from the French Foreign Legion to run a defence line from a disco club. He goes through many other adventures only to end up in the endless backwaters of the Neretva river where war threatens to arrive.

References

External links 
 

2000 films
Croatian war drama films
Croatian-language films
Films directed by Lukas Nola
Works about the Croatian War of Independence
Yugoslav Wars films